Frullania polysticta is a species of liverwort in the family Frullaniaceae. It is found in Portugal and Spain.

References

Frullaniaceae
Least concern plants
Taxonomy articles created by Polbot